"Puer nobis nascitur", usually translated as "Unto Us Is Born a Son", is a medieval Christmas carol found in a number of manuscript sources—the 14th-century German Moosburg Gradual and a 15th-century Trier manuscript. The Moosburg Gradual itself contained a number of melodies derived from the 12th- and 13th-century organum repertories of Notre Dame de Paris and the Abbey of Saint Martial, Limoges, suggesting that its antiquity may be much greater.

The song was first published in the 1582 Finnish song book Piae Cantiones, a volume of 74 medieval songs with Latin texts collected by Jaakko Suomalainen, a Finnish Lutheran cleric, and published by T. P. Rutha, a Catholic printer. The song book had its origins in the libraries of cathedral song schools, whose repertory also had strong links with medieval Prague, where clerical students from Finland and Sweden had studied for generations. Songs from Piae Cantiones continued to be performed in Finland until the 19th century. A setting by Michael Praetorius appears in his Musae Sioniae.

The book became well known in Britain after a rare original copy of Piae Cantiones owned by Peter of Nyland was given as a gift to the British Minister in Stockholm. He subsequently gave it to John Mason Neale in 1852, and it was from this copy that Neale, in collaboration with Thomas Helmore published songs in two collections in 1853 and 1854 respectively, although this carol was not included in either.

The carol became popular as a processional hymn following a translation by George Ratcliffe Woodward first published in 1902. Percy Dearmer also translated the hymn for inclusion in The Oxford Book of Carols (1928) as "Unto Us a Boy Is Born". Both translations are commonly used.

Robert Cummings of the All Music Guide notes that, "Its text speaks of the birth of Christ and of his mission on Earth. The melody is glorious in its triumphant character and ecstatic devotional sense ... a radiant hymn of strong appeal, brighter and more colorful than most of the chants emerging from and before the fourteenth century." He goes on to suggest that the first phrase and indeed the whole melody resembles the much later hymn, "O God, Our Help in Ages Past".

Text

Tune 
The melody associated with this text appears in the 16th-century collection Piae Cantiones. The following setting is by G. H. Palmer as it appears in The New English Hymnal:

See also
 List of Christmas carols

References

External links

14th-century hymns
15th-century hymns
16th-century hymns
Christmas carols
Piae Cantiones